Federal Route 135, comprising Jalan Teluk Sisik, Jalan Dato' Mahmud and Jalan Teluk Cempedak, is a federal road in Kuantan, Pahang, Malaysia. It is also a main route to Teluk Cempedak beach. The Kilometre Zero of the Federal Route 135 starts at Padang Lalang junctions.

Features

At most sections, the Federal Route 135 was built under the JKR R5 road standard, allowing maximum speed limit of up to 90 km/h.

List of junctions

References

Malaysian Federal Roads